Joscha Burkhalter (born 11 July 1996) is a Swiss biathlete who represented Switzerland at the 2022 Winter Olympics.

References

External links
 Joscha Burkhalter Website

Living people
1996 births
Swiss male biathletes
Sportspeople from the canton of Zürich
Biathletes at the 2022 Winter Olympics
Olympic biathletes of Switzerland